Choctaw is an unincorporated community located in Bolivar County, Mississippi, United States.

It is named for the Choctaw, one of the Five Civilized Tribes of the Southeast, who were indigenous to this area at the time of European settlement. Most of the Choctaw were forced to remove to Indian Territory west of the Mississippi River in the 1830s. The federally recognized Mississippi Band of Choctaw Indians is made up of descendants of those who remained in the territory and later state.

A post office operated under the name Choctaw from 1895 to 1920.

References

Unincorporated communities in Bolivar County, Mississippi
Unincorporated communities in Mississippi
Mississippi placenames of Native American origin